Joe Frederick (born August 18, 1969) is an American former professional ice hockey right winger.

Career
Frederick was drafted 242nd overall by the Detroit Red Wings in the 1989 NHL Entry Draft and played for the Adirondack Red Wings of the American Hockey League between 1993 and 1995. Though he never managed to play in the National Hockey League, he did play in the 1995 World Championship for the United States.

He later played in the International Hockey League for the next five seasons, playing for the Orlando Solar Bears, Phoenix Roadrunners, Chicago Wolves, Milwaukee Admirals, Manitoba Moose, Grand Rapids Griffins, Utah Grizzlies and Cleveland Lumberjacks. He also played seven games for HIFK in Finland's SM-liiga during the 1998–99 season.

Frederick also played five games for the Minnesota Blue Ox in Roller Hockey International during the 1995 season.

Career statistics

References

External links

1969 births
Living people
Anchorage Aces players
Adirondack Red Wings players
American men's ice hockey right wingers
Chicago Wolves (IHL) players
Cleveland Lumberjacks players
Detroit Red Wings draft picks
Fresno Falcons players
Grand Rapids Griffins (IHL) players
HIFK (ice hockey) players
Ice hockey players from Wisconsin
Las Vegas Wranglers players
Manitoba Moose (IHL) players
Milwaukee Admirals (IHL) players
Minnesota Blue Ox players
Northern Michigan Wildcats men's ice hockey players
Orlando Solar Bears (IHL) players
Phoenix Roadrunners (IHL) players
Sportspeople from Madison, Wisconsin
Utah Grizzlies (IHL) players
NCAA men's ice hockey national champions